The Eisner Award for Best Coloring is an award for "creative achievement" in American comic books. It is awarded to a colorist.

Name change
The award was named "Best Colorist" from 1992 until 1994.

Winners and nominees

Multiple awards and nominations

The following individuals have won Best Coloring or Best Colorist one or more times:

The following individuals have received two or more nominations but never won Best Coloring or Best Colorist:

Notes

See also
 Eisner Award for Best Publication for Early Readers
 Eisner Award for Best Academic/Scholarly Work
 Eisner Award for Best Writer
 Eisner Award for Best Cover Artist
 Eisner Award for Best Lettering

References

Coloring
1992 establishments in the United States
Annual events in the United States
Awards established in 1992
Category